The Red Dragon Historic District encompasses the historic buildings of the St. George's Episcopal mission in Cordova, Alaska.  It includes two buildings: the St. George's Episcopal Church, a modest wood-frame structure completed in 1919, and the "Red Dragon" Reading Room, so named because of its traditionally bright red exterior.  The Red Dragon was built in 1908, and was the second structure erected in Cordova.  It has long served as a social and recreational venue for the Cordova community, and for many years also housed the city's public library.

The district was listed on the National Register of Historic Places in 1982.

See also
National Register of Historic Places listings in Chugach Census Area, Alaska

References

Buildings and structures completed in 1918
Buildings and structures on the National Register of Historic Places in Chugach Census Area, Alaska
Churches on the National Register of Historic Places in Alaska
Cordova, Alaska
Episcopal church buildings in Alaska
Historic districts on the National Register of Historic Places in Alaska